The following lists events that happened in 2011 in Lebanon.

Incumbents
President: Michel Suleiman 
Prime Minister: Saad Hariri (until 13 June), Najib Mikati (starting 13 June)

Events

January
 12 January – The government collapses after Hezbollah withdraws while Prime Minister Hariri meets President of the United States Barack Obama.

Undated
North Atlantic Restaurant is founded.

References

 
Lebanon
2010s in Lebanon
Years of the 21st century in Lebanon
Lebanon